Sixty-Eight is a jazz album by drummer Billy Hart, released on SteepleChase in 2011. The album marks Hart's 68th recording for Steeplechase (and his first as a leader on the label), and his 68th year.

Reception

The AllMusic review by Ken Dryden states "Billy Hart's inspired drumming is the undercurrent of the date, pushing the younger musicians to play at the top of their respective games". JazzTimes' Thomas Conrad noted "Like a new-millennium Art Blakey, Hart leads a young sextet of hot emerging players, but the band here is edgier than the Jazz Messengers ever were. The careening, cacophonous repertoire comes from an earlier generation of free thinkers like Ornette Coleman and Sam Rivers. ...But the best thing about a recording led by Hart is the generous exposure to his volcanically eruptive, complex creative process".

Track listing
 "What Reason" (Ornette Coleman) - 5:40 		
 "Number Eight" (Eric Dolphy) - 5:53
 "Serene" (Dolphy) - 5:50
 "Fire Waltz" (Mal Waldron) - 6:52
 "Beatrice" (Sam Rivers) - 7:08
 "Cyclic Episode" (Rivers) - 9:08
 "That's Just Lovely" (Jason Palmer) - 6:37
 "Mrs Parker in K.C." (Jaki Byard) - 7:24
 "Punctuations" (Dan Tepfer) - 7:54 		
 "Out There" (Dolphy) - 7:04

Personnel
Billy Hart - drums
Jason Palmer - trumpet
Logan Richardson - alto saxophone
Dan Tepfer - piano
Michael Pinto - vibraphone
Chris Tordini - double bass

References

2011 albums
Billy Hart albums
SteepleChase Records albums